David Ellsworth Posey (born April 1, 1956) is a former American football kicker who played for the New England Patriots in the National Football League (NFL). He played college football at Florida University.

Early life and education 
When Posey was in St. Andrews high school, the Miami Dolphins trained at his campus while he was there, making him friends with many Dolphins players. Also because of that, he was trained by All-Pro Miami Dolphins starting kicker Garo Yepremian and Miami Dolphins backup kicker Karl Kremser. He was both a kicker and punter in high school. He was The Herald's 'Offensive Player of The Week' in Palm Beach County twice.

Posey came to Florida University with no scholarship, being a walk-on. In a game against the Auburn Tigers on November 2nd, 1974, Posey made 2 field goals including a 47 yarder to take the lead at halftime in a 25-14 victory.

Professional career 
Posey was drafted by the San Francisco 49ers in the 9th round of the 1977 NFL draft. He was cut by the 49ers before the season had begun, not playing at all in the 1977 season. In 1978, he was signed to the Atlanta Falcons during the preseason but was also cut by them.

However, during the 1978 NFL season, Posey got signed to the New England Patriots to replace the injured John Smith, whom got injured during week 3. In week 15 against the Buffalo Bills, Posey kicked a game-winning field goal to give the patriots their first ever division championship. Playing in eleven games, he made 11-of-22 field goals and 29-of-31 extra points. He played his first playoff game in the divisional round against the Houston Oilers. In that playoff loss, he made 2-of-2 extra points but missed his lone field goal.

References 

1956 births
Living people
American football placekickers
Florida Gators football players
San Francisco 49ers players
New England Patriots players
Atlanta Falcons players